Where on Earth may also refer to:
Where on Earth??, a South Korea variety show program
 Whereonearth, a company based in the United Kingdom and acquired by Yahoo!
Where on Earth, a 2012 collection of science fiction stories of Ursula Le Guin

See also
Where on Earth Is Carmen Sandiego?, an American animated television series
WOEID ((Where On Earth IDentifier)